Runaway Tour is a concert tour by British singer and songwriter Passenger in support of his 2018 studio album, Runaway. The tour began on August 29, 2018, in Edinburgh, Scotland.

Passenger's Australian friend Stu Larsen opened his shows from February 20 to April 21, 2019.

Production 
When the South American leg of the tour started, Passenger explained that his guitar would speak for itself, and all the songs would have their own stories.
"Every song has its own life, and that's what I like the fans to see in my presentations."

Concert synopsis 
All concerts have featured acoustic instruments. Throughout the tour, Passenger regularly alternates among various acoustic guitars. In a number of venues, he used up to four guitars per performance.

Critical reception 
The tour has been very well received by critics. Nicolas Tabares from El Observador, a national newspaper in Uruguay, called the Montevideo performances a "spectacle that connects directly to the crowd". He also commended Passenger on how he "shows all the love that he has to his fans." Caracol Radio from Colombia described the performance in Bogota, saying that "the performer involves the public with his great hits and funny humor." El Comercio, a newspaper in Peru, described the show in Lima as full of "music empathy".

Tour dates

References 

2018 concert tours
2019 concert tours